The discography of the South Korean boy band B.A.P, consists of four studio albums, nine extended plays, and nineteen singles.

B.A.P released their debut EP Warrior in February 2012. It entered the Gaon Album Chart at number 3 and the Billboard World Albums Chart at number 10. Their follow-up EP Power peaked at number 2 on the Gaon Album Chart and number 10 on the Billboard World Albums Chart.

Albums

Studio albums

Extended plays

Single albums

Singles

Other charted songs

Music videos

References

Discographies of South Korean artists
K-pop music group discographies
Discography